Pilipectus taiwanus is a species of moth of the family Noctuidae first described by Wileman in 1915. It is found in Taiwan.

References

Moths described in 1915
Calpinae